The Gradient Avax is a Czech single-place, paraglider designed and produced by Gradient sro of Prague. Introduced in the early 2000s, it remained in production in 2016 as the Avax XC5.

Design and development
The Avax was designed as a competition glider.

The design has progressed through five generations of models, the Avax, Avax 2, 3, 4 and 5, each improving on the last. The models are each named for their approximate wing area in square metres.

The Avax XC5 employs a unit cell structure that uses a combination of two non-carrying ribs with double diagonal segmented ribs attached to the wing's top surface. The wing trailing edge employs mini-ribs to maintain a smooth profile.

Variants
Avax RSE 24
Small-sized model for lighter pilots.
Avax RSE 26
Mid-sized model for medium-weight pilots. The glider model is AFNOR Competition certified.
Avax RSE 28
Large-sized model for heavier pilots.
Avax XC5 24
Small-sized model for lighter pilots. The glider model is EN/LTF-D certified.
Avax XC5 26
Mid-sized model for medium-weight pilots. The glider model is EN/LTF-D certified.
Avax XC5 28
Large-sized model for heavier pilots. The glider model is EN/LTF-D certified.

Specifications (Avax RSE 26)

References

External links

Avax
Paragliders